The Singapore Progressive Party (abbreviation: PP), or simply the Progressive Party, was a political party that was formed on 25 August 1947. It won the 1948 Legislative Assembly general elections with half of the contested seats in the Legislative Assembly, 3 out of 6. At that time, the self-government power of the Legislative Assembly was still rather limited.

History
The party was founded by three lawyers, namely Tan Chye Cheng, John Laycock and Nazir Ahmad Mallal. All three were educated at the University of London and were three of the six first ever elected legislative councillors in Singapore. The party was Singapore's first political party.

Party ideology
The Progressive Party was heavily backed by and made up of English-speaking upper class professionals. Its campaign ideology was to advocate progressive and gradual reforms, rather than sudden, quick, radical ones, which fell in line with British policy at the time, to slowly let Singapore gain full self-government. This approach was criticised vehemently by David Saul Marshall, leader of the Labour Front who instead wanted rapid reform.

Legislative Council
In the Legislative Council, the SPP worked closely with the British Government. The SPP fought for equal treatment with both local and European civil servants, but this did not please the Chinese-educated locals, who were very unhappy with the SPP's Pro-British stance.

Central Provident Fund
In 1951, PP drafted a law for the setting up of a Central Provident Fund, and it was approved by the British government in 1954, this CPF scheme provides financial security for workers in their retirement or for workers who were unable to work, this scheme came into effect in 1955, when David Marshall took office, and even after so many years, the CPF scheme despite having a few revisions and changes, remains in Singapore.

Election Results

Legislative Council

 Legislative Council By-Elections

Legislative Assembly

Municipal Council(till 1951) / City Council(since 1951)

References

Background of Progressive Party

Conservative parties in Singapore
Defunct political parties in Singapore
Political parties established in 1947
Political parties disestablished in 1956
1947 establishments in Singapore
1956 disestablishments in Singapore